The Burlington Junction Railway  is a Class III short line railroad which was chartered in 1985. Originally operating on the southernmost  of the former Burlington, Cedar Rapids and Northern Railway mainline in Burlington, Iowa after abandonment by the Chicago, Rock Island and Pacific Railroad, it provides short freight hauling, switching operations, locomotive repair, and transloading services, the latter currently handling over 3,000 carloads a year. Typical commodity types transported include chemicals and fertilizer. The BJRY's primary interchange partner is the BNSF Railway.

The BJRY power fleet currently numbers twenty locomotives. Other Burlington Junction Railway assets include  of warehouse space, as well as various types of bulk material handling equipment such as augers.

As of February 2010, the carrier operates seven various local industrial railroads:

Burlington, Iowa (Switch Carrier / Connection to BNSF) 
Trackage: 

LeMars, Iowa (Switch Carrier / Connection to CN)
Mt. Pleasant, Iowa (Switch Carrier / Connection to BNSF)
Trackage: 

Ottumwa, Iowa (Switch Carrier / Connection to BNSF)
Trackage: 

Quincy, Illinois (Switch Carrier / Connection to BNSF & and Norfolk Southern )
Trackage:  
	
Rochelle, Illinois (Trackage owned by the City of Rochelle / Connection to BNSF & UP)
Montgomery, Illinois (Switch Carrier / Connection to BNSF)
Fenton/Valley Park, Missouri (Switch Carrier / Connection to BNSF)

References

Illinois railroads
Iowa railroads
Switching and terminal railroads
Spin-offs of the Burlington Northern Railroad
Burlington, Iowa